The Red Badge of Courage is a 1951 American war film made by MGM. Directed by John Huston, it was produced by Gottfried Reinhardt with Dore Schary as executive producer. The screenplay is by John Huston, adapted by Albert Band from Stephen Crane's 1895 novel of the same name. The cinematography is by Harold Rosson, and the music score by Bronislau Kaper. The making of this film is the subject of Lillian Ross's 1952 book Picture, originally in The New Yorker. 
  
The American Civil War film is a sparse but faithful retelling of the story, incorporating narration from the text to move the plot forward. Audie Murphy, a hero of World War II who later went into acting, played the lead role of Henry Fleming. Other actors include cartoonist Bill Mauldin, Andy Devine, Arthur Hunnicutt and Royal Dano.

Plot
In 1862, a regiment of the Union Army is encamped near the Rappahannock River in Virginia.  Orders direct the regiment to move up river to engage the enemy. Private Henry Fleming tells his comrades he is not afraid. On patrol, Henry exchanges words with an unseen Confederate soldier stationed across the river who tells Henry to watch out for the "red badge," meaning a battle wound. The regiment confidently sets out, but Henry is pensive. As the regiment engages in battle, Henry's buddy, Tom Wilson, tells Henry to give his watch to his parents if he is killed. During the battle, Henry deserts his regiment. He learns his outfit won the battle, but he fears derision if he returns. Henry sees his wounded comrades coming from battle, and wishes he, too, had a "red badge of courage." Henry slips back into the regiment as they march. One of his comrades, Jim Conklin, is delusional from his injuries and dies. Henry sees another Union regiment retreating and he is knocked unconscious by a soldier who refuses to tell Henry the reason for the retreat. Regaining consciousness, Henry meets a soldier who escorts him to his regiment. Henry falsely tells Tom his head injury was received in battle. Henry tells Tom about Jim's death. Tom tells Henry his absence was not noticed due to the heavy casualties suffered. The next day, Henry talks as if he, too, engaged in the battle.

The regiment faces another battle. This time, Henry wildly charges toward the enemy with passion until he is ordered back into ranks. Henry and Tom fetch water at a creek and overhear the General planning an attack. They report the news to the regiment. The regiment attacks. As some of his comrades fall, Henry charges forward yelling for his outfit to keep moving as he carries the flag. Henry meets the flag bearer for the Confederate troops, who falls dead. Henry briefly holds both flags as the regiment secures the defeated rebels. A soldier tells Henry and the regiment that he overheard their commanding officers lauding Henry's bravery. Henry admits to Tom that he deserted the day before, and that his shame made him return. Tom admits he deserted, too, but was caught and forced back into the battle. The regiment marches on as Henry contemplates the hope of a peaceful future.

Cast
 Audie Murphy as Henry Fleming (aka The Youth)  
 Bill Mauldin as Tom Wilson (aka The Loud Soldier)  
 Douglas Dick as The Lieutenant  
 Royal Dano as The Tattered Man  
 John Dierkes as Jim Conklin (aka The Tall Soldier)  
 Arthur Hunnicutt as Bill Porter  
 Tim Durant as The General
 Andy Devine as The Cheery Soldier
 Robert Easton as Thompson
 John Huston as Grizzled Union Veteran (uncredited)
 William Phipps as Union Soldier (uncredited) 
 William Schallert as Union Soldier (uncredited)   
 James Whitmore as Narrator (voice, uncredited)

Production
Director John Huston used unusual compositions and camera angles drawn from film noir to create an alienating battlefield environment. He became frustrated when the studio cut the film's length to 70 minutes and added narration taken from the original novel following supposedly poor audience test screenings.
 
Much of the history of the making of this film, considered by some a mutilated masterpiece, is found in Lillian Ross' critically acclaimed book Picture. Of the stars who appear in the film, three served in World War II: Bill Mauldin the editorial cartoonist who created "Up Front", Audie Murphy served with the U.S. Army in Europe, and narrator James Whitmore served with the U.S. Marine Corps.

John Huston had high hopes for this movie, even considered the original two-hour cut of the film as the best he had ever made as a director. After a power struggle at the top of MGM management, the film was cut from a two-hour epic to the 69-minute version released to theaters in response to its alleged universally disastrous previews. It never was released as an "A" feature but was shown as a second-feature "B" picture. Both Huston and star Audie Murphy tried unsuccessfully to purchase the film so that it could be re-edited to its original length. Huston did not waste any time fighting over it because he was focused on the pre-production of his next picture, The African Queen. The studio claimed that the cut footage was destroyed, probably in the 1965 MGM vault fire. Huston later was asked by MGM in 1975 if he had an original cut because the studio wanted to release it. Huston told them he didn't have one, that it didn't exist. However, after this he instructed his agent Paul Kohner to include in all his future contracts a stipulation that he receive a 16 mm print of the first cut of any film he made.

Reception
According to MGM records, the film earned $789,000 in the US and Canada and $291,000 in other countries, resulting in a loss of $1,018,000. This made it one of the studio's least successful films of the year although it did not lose as much money as Calling Bulldog Drummond, Mr Imperium or Inside Straight.

Comic book adaptation
 Fawcett Motion Picture Comics #105 (July 1951)

See also
 The Red Badge of Courage
 List of films cut over the director's opposition
 List of incomplete or partially lost films

References

External links

 
 
 
 
 The Red Badge of Courage at Audie Murphy Memorial Site
 The Red Badge of Courage (novel) site

1951 films
1950s lost films
1950s war drama films
American Civil War films
American war drama films
1950s English-language films
Films based on American novels
Films directed by John Huston
Lost American films
Metro-Goldwyn-Mayer films
American black-and-white films
Audie Murphy
Films with screenplays by John Huston
Films adapted into comics
Films scored by Bronisław Kaper
Lost war drama films
1950s American films